Trinity College London (TCL) is an examination board based in London, United Kingdom, which offers graded and diploma qualifications (up to postgraduate level) across a range of disciplines in the performing arts and English language learning and teaching in over 70 countries worldwide.

Trinity College London was founded as the external examinations board of Trinity College of Music (which today is part of the Trinity Laban Conservatoire of Music and Dance) in 1872, and began offering exams in music to external students in 1877. Over time, Trinity expanded to offer exams in other areas of the performing arts and in English for Speakers of Other Languages (ESOL).

With over 850,000 candidates in more than 60 countries worldwide, Trinity's qualifications are specifically designed to help learners realise their potential.

History

Performing arts examinations
In 2004, Trinity College London's performing arts examinations division merged with the external examinations department of the Guildhall School of Music and Drama to form the Trinity Guildhall examinations board. The name Trinity Guildhall was dropped in 2012, and the board's performing arts examinations are now offered under the Trinity College London brand.

Music
Trinity College London offers graded musical qualifications for musical theory and for performance in a range of string instruments, singing, piano, electronic keyboards, brass, woodwind instruments and percussions. The grading begins with the Initial Grade and then is numbered from Grade 1 to Grade 8 with increasing difficulty. Candidates are rated under three categories – the performance of musical pieces, technical work such as scales, and supporting tests such as sight reading and improvisation. Candidates are graded on a scale from 1 to 100, with 60 being the pass mark. Candidates have some flexibility in the choices of pieces and tests prepared for each of these sections.

In addition to graded examinations, TCL also offers foundation, intermediate and advanced certificates in music.
TCL also offers diplomas in music at three levels - Associate (ATCL, which is equivalent to the standard of work required for a UK Certificate of Higher Education) and AmusTCL, Licentiate (LTCL, which is equivalent to the standard of work required for a UK Bachelor's degree) and Fellowship (FTCL, which is equivalent to the standard of work required for a UK Master's degree).

In 2012, the exam board introduced Rock & Pop graded examinations for bass, drums, guitar, keyboard and vocals.

Drama and performance
Trinity College London offers a choice of qualifications for students and teachers of drama and speech subjects with various levels of experience and ability. Exams can be taken by individuals, pairs or groups. Study strands include Speech and Drama, Individual Acting Skills, Group Performance, Shakespeare, Choral Speaking, Communication Skills, Musical Theatre and Performance Arts.

As is the case with music, diplomas in drama, performance and communication subjects are also offered at three levels, and TCL is the awarding body for the series of professional performing arts courses that are funded in part by the Dance and Drama Awards scheme.

In 2012, the exam board introduced Rock & Pop graded examinations for bass, drums, guitar, keyboard and vocals. Candidates perform their ‘set list’ from eight songs in their published Songbook for each grade, as well as improvisation and playback session skills – needed to be successful in the industry. 

In 2020 Trinity introduced Digital Grades and Diplomas – an online submission-based version of the well-established face-to-face qualifications. In response to changes in the way people learn and consume music, these exams were designed to support teaching, learning and assessment through a digital medium. They are fully regulated qualifications – with each level corresponding with its equivalent face-to-face option – offering learners a greater choice and flexibility.

Arts Award
Within the United Kingdom, Trinity College London manages Arts Award in association with Arts Council England.

English Language examinations
Trinity’s English language qualifications focus on giving learners lifelong transferable skills that they will need for future study and work. English language qualifications include English for Speakers of Other Languages (ESOL), Teaching English for Speakers of Other Languages (TESOL) and Secure English Language Tests (SELTs).

ESOL qualifications
Trinity’s English for Speakers of Other Languages (ESOL) qualifications cover all levels, from beginner to advanced. Trinity offers two skills oral assessments and four skills reading, writing, speaking and listening assessments as well as young learner awards.

TESOL qualifications 
Trinity’s English language teaching qualifications (Teaching English for Speakers of Other Languages (TESOL) are designed to support teachers throughout their careers — from early practitioners to experienced professionals.

SELT 
Trinity offers Secure English Language Tests (SELTs) which are approved for applications to UKVI for visas, UK visa renewal, British Citizenship, Settlement and Leave to Remain. Trinity has 20 centrally located SELT centres in the UK providing exam sessions seven days a week. Book a SELT exam here.

References

External links
Trinity College London

Qualification awarding bodies in the United Kingdom
Performing arts in London
1872 establishments in England
Organizations established in 1872